A list of films produced in Egypt in 1996. For an A-Z list of films currently on Wikipedia, see :Category:Egyptian films.

External links
 Egyptian films of 1996 at the Internet Movie Database
 Egyptian films of 1996 elCinema.com

Lists of Egyptian films by year
1996 in Egypt
Lists of 1996 films by country or language